Washington County History & Landmarks Foundation is a non-profit educational institution in Washington, Pennsylvania.  Its purpose is to encourage and assist the preservation of historic structures in Washington County, Pennsylvania.  The foundation operates its own landmark certification process, as well as working with the National Park Service to document and place landmarks on the National Register of Historic Places.  It also offers advice and assistance for historic building owners who wish to preserve their facilities.  Since its inception, the foundation has been successful in helping many historic building owners in the preservation of their structures.

For a number of years, the foundation has been in conflict with Washington & Jefferson College.  In 1968, the college's campus master plan called for the expansion of the campus eastward towards Wade Avenue in East Washington Borough, a plan that placed them in conflict with the residents of that area.  For the next 30 years, the college maintained a policy of purchasing any homes in that area as they became available.  In response, the Washington County History and Landmarks Foundation was able to get the East Washington Historic District, a collection of 120 Victorian homes in that area, added to the National Register of Historic Places in 1984.  The college opposed the designation but did not object in time to prevent it.  According to College President Howard J. Burnett, the district "was structured to prevent expansion of the college."

In the 1990s, the hard feelings between some residents and the college came to a head, with residents trying to have the Borough enact anti-demolition laws to block expansion and a meeting of the Washington County History and Landmarks Foundation deteriorated into a shouting match between residents and college officials.  Burnett maintained that the expansion was beneficial to the community and that the opposition came from a small and non-representative group on Wade Avenue.  He also questioned the historic value of many of the designated homes, pointing out that many of them were in very poor shape and others were vacant.  As of 1995, the college owned about 30 properties listed in the historic district.  In the end, efforts to block the demolition of these buildings, including several which were part of the historic district,  were unsuccessful.  Notably, one 140-year-old farm house at 137 South Wade Street, which the college had acquired in 1977 after being vacant for several years, was moved to a new location outside of town.

In 2009, the foundation sponsored an architectural survey of buildings in the African American areas of Washington.

Bridges

Historic districts

Public landmarks

Residential landmarks and farmsteads

See also

National Register of Historic Places listings in Washington County, Pennsylvania
List of Pennsylvania state historical markers in Washington County

References

Washington County, Pennsylvania
Historic preservation organizations in the United States
Non-profit organizations based in Pennsylvania
Historical societies in Pennsylvania
Washington, Pennsylvania